Salacia miegei is a species of plant in the family Celastraceae. It is endemic to Côte d'Ivoire, where it grows in Western Guinean lowland forests, including Taï National Park, a protected area of primary rainforest and high endemism.  It is threatened by habitat loss.

References

miegei
Endemic flora of Ivory Coast
Vulnerable flora of Africa
Taxonomy articles created by Polbot